Mount Kempe is a peak,  high, midway between Mount Huggins and Mount Dromedary in the Royal Society Range of Victoria Land, Antarctica. It was discovered by the British National Antarctic Expedition (1901–04) which named it for Sir Alfred Bray Kempe, at that time Treasurer of the Royal Society. Auster Pass is a high pass between Mount Huggins and Mount Kempe.

References

Mountains of Victoria Land
Scott Coast